Seachd Là (Seven Days) is a weekly Scottish Gaelic-language news magazine produced by BBC Alba, featuring a round up of the week's news. Its stories are from BBC Alba's news programmes An Là and Eòrpa. It is shown on Sundays from the Glasgow newsroom and is presented by An Là weather presenter, Kirsteen MacDonald.

See also
 An Là

External links
 

BBC Regional News shows
BBC Alba shows
2008 Scottish television series debuts
2000s Scottish television series
2010s Scottish television series
2020s Scottish television series
BBC Scotland television shows
Scottish television news shows